Myitkyina University is a university in northern Myitkyina, Myanmar. 

Since 1996, on-campus student housing has been banned. However, there were plans to reopen the Hkakaborazi (to house 120 male students) and Sumprabum (to house 128 female students) residence halls in 2013.

References

Universities and colleges in Myanmar
Myitkyina